Warren Thompson is the name of:

 Warren A. Thompson (1802–1891), explorer and original citizen of Butler County, Alabama
 Warren T. Thompson, American photographer
 Warren Thompson (boxer) (born 1956), amateur boxing champion
 Warren Thompson (rugby league) (born 1990), professional rugby league player
 Warren Thompson (1887–1973), demographer, see demographic transition
 Warren Thompson (fighter)
 Warren E. Thompson, author of military history
 Warren Thompson, the main character of Warren

See also
Warren Thomson (1935–2015), Australian pianist, music editor, music educator and piano competition juror